Tremp is a municipality in Catalonia, Spain, the capital of the comarca of the Pallars Jussà. It is the largest municipality in Catalonia in terms of area, accounting for nearly a quarter of the total area of the comarca.

The municipality is a geographical oddity and consists of five separate territorial entities within the comarca (district) of Pallars Jussa (see image). The town of Tremp (population 6228 as of 2009) is the second smallest of these and is situated in the valley of the Noguera Pallaresa river below Talarn and the Talarn Dam. The largest portion of the municipal territory lies to the west of the valley of the Noguera Pallaresa and stretches as far as the Noguera Ribagorçana river. A third portion is an exclave of the comarca within the municipality of el Pont de Suert in the Alta Ribagorça. In the east the villages of Palau de Noguera, Suterranya and Vilamitjana form the fourth entity, while the fifth and smallest portion (of only 1,59 km2) is formed by the village of Puigcercós, south of Tremp.

The town is served by the C-13 road which runs along the valley of the Noguera Pallaresa.

Demography

Subdivisions 
The municipality of Tremp includes twenty-eight outlying settlements: populations are given as of 2005.
Acadèmia General Bàsica de Subofficials (26)
Aulàs (15)
El Castellet (3)
Casterner de les Olles (1)
Castissent (20), on the left bank of the Noguera Ribagorçana river
Claramunt (1)
Claret (2)
Eroles (11)
Escarlà (2)
Espills (5)
Espluga Freda (1)
Espluga de Serra (45)
Fígols de Tremp (2)
Gurp (8)
Els Masos de Tamúrcia (12)
Palau de Noguera (85)
El Pont d'Orrit (15)
Puigcercós (52)
Puigverd (1)
Sant Adrià (4)
Santa Engràcia (24), with sulfurous springs
Sapeira (2)
Suterranya (69)
Tendrui (5)
Tercui (2), on a hill above the Noguera Ribagorçana
Torogó (2)
La Torre de Tamúrcia (17)
Vilamitjana (207), on the road to Artesa de Segre

See also
Talarn Dam

References

External links

Official website 
 Government data pages Catalunya] 

Municipalities in Pallars Jussà
Populated places in Pallars Jussà